Double Nickels on the Dime is the third album by American punk trio Minutemen, released on the California independent record label SST Records in 1984. A double album containing 45 songs, Double Nickels on the Dime combines elements of punk rock, funk, country, spoken word and jazz, and references a variety of themes, from the Vietnam War and racism in America, to working-class experience and linguistics.

After recording new material, each band member selected songs for different sides of the double album, with the fourth side named "Chaff". Several songs on Double Nickels on the Dime were outsourced to or inspired by contemporaries, such as Black Flag's Henry Rollins and Jack Brewer of Saccharine Trust.

Double Nickels on the Dime is seen not only as Minutemen's crowning achievement, but, according to critic Mark Deming, "one of the very best American rock albums of the 1980s". The album now appears on many professional lists of the all-time best rock albums, including [[Rolling Stone's 500 Greatest Albums of All Time|Rolling Stone'''s 500 Greatest Albums of All Time]]. Despite this, the full version of the album is only available on vinyl.

Background
Minutemen were formed by guitarist D. Boon and bassist Mike Watt, both from San Pedro, California, in 1980. After their previous band, The Reactionaries, disbanded in 1979, the pair continued to write new material and formed the band with drummer Frank Tonche a year later. Minutemen signed to the Californian independent record label SST Records following their second gig. George Hurley, the former drummer of The Reactionaries, replaced Tonche as drummer soon afterwards. The Minutemen were noted in the California punk scene for a philosophy of "jamming econo"; a sense of thriftiness reflected in their touring and presentation. They soon released numerous recordings through SST and their own label, New Alliance Records, while touring with hardcore punk bands like Black Flag and Hüsker Dü.

In January 1983, Minutemen were asked by ex-Blue Cheer keyboardist and local producer Ethan James to contribute a song to Radio Tokyo Tapes, a compilation named after the Californian studio where James worked. The band agreed and contributed three songs to the compilation, with James recording them all for free. These three songs, and another five recorded in May 1983 for a total of $50, were included in their 1983 EP Buzz or Howl Under the Influence of Heat. The band had recorded solely with SST engineer Spot prior to the recordings. However, they were so impressed by the sessions that they enlisted James to record their next full-length album; Watt later commented: "Ethan, although not knowing us much, tapped right in." After their European tour in mid-1983 with Black Flag, Minutemen entered Radio Tokyo Studios in November to record their next studio album.

Recording and production
Minutemen originally recorded an "album's worth of material" with James in November 1983 in Radio Tokyo Studios. However, after hearing labelmates Hüsker Dü's double album Zen Arcade (1984), which had been recorded a month earlier, Minutemen decided to write more material. Watt later commented: "It wasn't really a competition even. When I wrote 'Take that Hüskers!" in [the album's liner notes] it was acknowledging that they gave us the idea to make a double album." Unlike Hüsker Dü's Zen Arcade, Minutemen did not have a unifying concept, but soon decided that the record's concept would be their cars.

The band wrote almost two dozen more songs for a second recording session with James in April 1984. Double Nickels on the Dime was then mixed on a single eight-track in one night by James and cost $1,100 to record. Several songs on the album were recorded elsewhere; a studio-recorded cover of Creedence Clearwater Revival's "Don't Look Now" was replaced with a live version of the song, and according to Watt, "Love Dance" was written at Ian MacKaye's Dischord House.

For sequencing, the band decided that each band member would be allocated a side of the record, an arrangement inspired by Pink Floyd's 1969 double album Ummagumma. The band drew straws to select songs; Hurley won the draw and decided to pick his solo track "You Need the Glory", followed by Boon and Watt. The fourth side of the record was named "Side Chaff", an admission that the songs present were the leftover songs.

Music
Watt refers to the album as being the band's art record in the documentary We Jam Econo: The Story of The Minutemen. The songwriting styles of Boon and Watt on Double Nickels on the Dime contrasted. Boon tended to write the band's anthems, and often explored wider political issues. "This Ain't No Picnic" was an example of his approach. Exploring racism and the strife of the working class with both gravity and humor, he composed the song after his supervisor would not let him listen to jazz and soul music on the radio at his day job, calling it "nigger shit".

Watt favored complex and abstract lyrical themes, exemplified by songs such as "The Glory Of Man" and "My Heart and the Real World". Influenced by James Joyce's novel Ulysses (the subject of "June 16th") and the stream of consciousness literary technique in general, Watt's lyrics were often complex and philosophical. On "Take 5, D.", Boon felt that the lyrics were "too spacey". Watt agreed to rewrite the song, adding: "There ain't nothing going to be more real." He found a new set of lyrics: a note from a friend's landlady about a leaking shower.Double Nickels on the Dime contained several inside jokes that were missed by the band's audience. Watt later remarked: "No one knew what the fuck we were talking about. We'd explain it to people and they'd say, 'I don't get it, what's so funny about that?' And we couldn't tell them because it was our whole angle on the rock & roll, our worldview on the music scene."

Packaging
The album was named Double Nickels on the Dime as a reaction to the Sammy Hagar song "I Can't Drive 55," a protest against the federally imposed speed limit of 55 miles per hour on all U.S. highways in place at the time. Minutemen decided that driving fast "wasn't terribly defiant"; Watt later commented that "the big rebellion thing was writing your own fuckin' songs and trying to come up with your own story, your own picture, your own book, whatever. So he can't drive 55, because that was the national speed limit? Okay, we'll drive 55, but we'll make crazy music."

The band illustrated the theme on the cover of Double Nickels on the Dime, which depicts Watt driving his Volkswagen Beetle at exactly 55 miles per hour ("double nickels" in trucker slang) traveling southbound through downtown Los Angeles, where Interstate 10 ("The Dime" in trucker slang)  meets the San Pedro Intersection of Route 11/110, also known as the Harbor Freeway, toward the band's hometown of San Pedro, California. "The title means fifty-five miles per hour on the button, like we were Johnny Conservative."Azerrad p.82. Dirk Vandenberg, the band's "buddy/contributor," took photos from the backseat as Watt drove under the sign to San Pedro; it took three circuits of the highway and two days of photography before Minutemen were happy with the cover. Vandenberg later commented on the cover art: "There were three elements that Mike [Watt] wanted in the photo: a natural kind of glint in his eyes reflected in the rearview mirror, the speedometer pinned exactly at 55mph, and, of course, the San Pedro sign guiding us home". However, when the cover was presented to SST, "someone botched the cropping for the print and cut off the end of the word Pedro."

In 2020, Watt revealed that the front cover of the album was also inspired by the cover of Kraftwerk's 1974 album Autobahn.

Release
SST Records released Double Nickels on the Dime on double vinyl in July 1984. SST delayed the release of Zen Arcade by Hüsker Dü so that both albums could be released simultaneously. After the release of Double Nickels on the Dime, Minutemen toured almost constantly to promote the record. One 1984 tour saw the band playing 57 dates in 63 days. The album sold fifteen thousand copies during 1984, a respectable amount for a band on an independent record label. As of 2008, Double Nickels on the Dime remains Minutemen's best-selling record.

No singles were released to promote Double Nickels on the Dime, but SST did press a sampler EP that was sent to radio stations. Titled, "Wheels of Fortune," the sampler put nine of the album's "deep cuts" onto one side of a 12" record and featured an etching by Raymond Pettibon on the other. The band also released two videos, "This Ain't No Picnic" and "Ain't Talkin' 'bout Love" (a cover of a song by Van Halen, which the aforementioned Hagar would eventually join), as "flyers". Made for $440 by a University of California, Los Angeles graduate, Anthony Johnson, "This Ain't No Picnic" was Minutemen's first video and was later nominated for an MTV award. It features the band playing amidst rubble as a fighter plane "piloted" by Ronald Reagan, edited from public domain footage, fires at them. The video of "Ain't Talkin' 'Bout Love", released by SST as a promotional video, was a 40-second recording of a live performance.

In August 1987, Watt and producer Vitus Matare remastered Double Nickels on the Dime for a CD release. To ensure that the CD would be compatible with all players, they omitted all car jams except Boon's, and three songs: "Mr. Robot's Holy Orders", "Ain't Talkin' 'bout Love" and "Little Man With A Gun In His Hand". Watt commented later that the remix was a "nightmare" and "totally worse than the Ethan James mix." Watt reverted to the original mix for a 1989 CD release of Double Nickels on the Dime, but did not include the previously omitted songs. In a January 2006 interview, Watt announced his intention to discuss a remastered full Double Nickels on the Dime CD release with SST owner Greg Ginn.

"This Ain't No Picnic" was tapped to be Minutemen's first ever music video, directed by Randall Jahnson and shot in black and white for $450. The "plot" has the Minutemen singing the song in a barren field that is about to be bombed by then-president Ronald Reagan (as seen in clips from a public domain war film he starred in).

Critical recognition

Upon its release, Double Nickels on the Dime received critical acclaim from a range of American critics; however as a regional independent record label, many of SST's releases did not attract attention from British music magazines. Robert Palmer of The New York Times called the album "more varied musically than any of their earlier disks", adding that the band "think of themselves as town criers, addressing their young constituencies directly with lyrics that apply to the life styles they share, teaching such values as tolerance of cultural, racial and sexual differences". The Village Voice critic Robert Christgau described Boon as a "somewhat limited singer" but "a hell of a reader, with a guitar that rhymes", and remarking "this is poetry-with-jazz as it always should have been". Christgau later said that he underrated the album on its original release. Double Nickels on the Dime placed at number 14 in the publication's end of year Pazz & Jop critics' poll. Reviewing the album in February 1985 for Rolling Stone, David Fricke awarded the album three and a half stars, and also praised Boon's technique, stating: "The telegraphic stutter and almost scientific angularity of singer-guitarist D. Boon's chordings and breakneck solos heighten the jazzier tangents he dares to take," but that "Double Nickels on the Dime's best moments go far too quickly."

Later reviews have also been positive: AllMusic's Mark Deming described Double Nickels on the Dime as a "quantum leap into greatness" for Minutemen, describing the album as "full of striking moments that cohere into a truly remarkable whole" and awarding a full five stars. Journalist Michael Azerrad, profiling Minutemen in his book Our Band Could Be Your Life (titled after a lyric from "History Lesson – Part II"), named Double Nickels on the Dime as "one of the greatest achievements of the indie era" and described it as a "Whitman's sampler of left-wing politics, moving autobiographical vignettes, and twisted Beefheartian twang". Several publications have raised their rating of the album in the years since its release; Rolling Stone re-reviewed Double Nickels on the Dime for the 2004 Album Guide and gave it its classic rating, a full five stars.

Legacy
Although not commercially successful upon its release, Double Nickels on the Dime marked the point where many punk bands began to ignore the stylistic limitations of the hardcore scene. According to American Hardcore: A Tribal History author Steven Blush, Double Nickels on the Dime was, along with Zen Arcade, "either the pinnacle or downfall of the pure hardcore scene." Watt later commented that Double Nickels on the Dime was the "best album I ever played on."

The album was included in the book 1001 Albums You Must Hear Before You Die. AcclaimedMusic.net finds it to be the 305th most acclaimed album of all time. In 2019, the listeners of KEXP-FM ranked it the 223rd greatest album of all time (out of 666).

* designates unordered lists.

The album inspired a collection of comics and drawings entitled Double Nickels Forever. The book features work by 58 artists based on 45 songs from the album. The album was also featured as an entry in Continuum International Publishing Group's 33 1/3 series of books. Michael T. Fournier authored the book which breaks the album down song by song to analyze its creation.

Track listing
Original vinyl release

Differences
All released CD versions omit songs to ensure player compatibility. The tracks removed include "Mr. Robot's Holy Orders", "Ain't Talkin' 'bout Love", "Little Man with a Gun in His Hand", "Don't Look Now" and "Dr. Wu". The 1989 CD release restored the last two songs in place of three of the "car jams". All online and streaming versions use the 1989 CD track listing.

Wheels of Fortune EP

One-sided record sent to radio stations to promote Double Nickels on the Dime"Glory of Man"
"Nothing Indeed"
"Political Song for Michael Jackson to Sing"
"History Lesson (Part II)"
"Maybe Partying Will Help"
"Storm in My House
"Jesus and Tequila"
"Don't Look Now"
"Dr. Wu"

Personnel
All information taken from the 1989 CD release of Double Nickels on the Dime:
Minutemen
D. Boon – vocals, guitar
Mike Watt – bass; vocals on "Take 5, D.", "Dr. Wu", and "The Politics of Time"
George Hurley – drums, vocals
with:
Joe Baiza –  guitar on "Take 5, D."
John Rocknowski –  guitar on "Take 5, D."
Dirk Vandenberg –  guitar on "Take 5, D."
Ethan James –  producer and engineer

Notes

References
Azerrad, Michael. Our Band Could Be Your Life: Scenes from the American Indie Underground, 1981–1991. Little Brown and Company, 2001. .
Fournier, Michael T. Double Nickels on the Dime 33⅓''. Continuum, 2007. .

External links
Complete lyrics

 Double Nickels on the Dime at Myspace (streamed copy where licensed)

1984 albums
SST Records albums
Minutemen (band) albums